The 1991 American South Conference men's basketball tournament was held March 1–3 at Lakefront Arena at the University of New Orleans in New Orleans, Louisiana.

 defeated New Orleans in the championship game, 61–56, to take home their third American South men's basketball tournament title in four years.

The Bulldogs received an automatic invitation to the 1991 NCAA Tournament as the #12 seed in the Southeast region. Regular season co-champion New Orleans received an at-large bid as the #14 seed in the Southeast region.

Format
All seven conference members participated in the tournament field. They were seeded based on regular season conference records. The top seed, New Orleans, was given a bye into the semifinals while the other six teams were placed and paired into the initial quarterfinal round.

All games were played at Lakefront Arena in New Orleans, Louisiana.

Bracket

References

American South Conference men's basketball tournament
1990–91 American South Conference men's basketball season
1991 in sports in Louisiana